50th Brigade or 50th Infantry Brigade may refer to:

 50th Mechanized Infantry Brigade (Greece)
 50th Indian Brigade of the British Indian Army in the First World War
 50th Parachute Brigade (India)
 50th Indian Tank Brigade
 50th Brigade (United Kingdom)
 50th Infantry Brigade Combat Team (United States)

See also

 50th Division (disambiguation)